National Alliance July 18 (AN18) was a far-right nationalist electoral coalition in Spain, formed ahead of the 1977 elections by New Force of Blas Piñar, Círculos Doctrinales José Antonio and Carlist Traditionalist Communion. July 18 refers to the day on which the Nationalist forces under the leadership of Francisco Franco launched a military uprising in 1936.

History
Despite the attempt to gather all parties of the far-right, the "National Alliance" did not manage to integrate into its ranks all political forces of similar sign, as the Traditionalist Communion or the Spanish Falange of the JONS didn't join the coalition, The alliance gained 86,390 votes and no seats. This failure led the main party (Fuerza Nueva) to create a new (and more successful) coalition for the general elections of 1979; National Union.

Elections results

Congress of Deputies / Senate

References

 AN-18 (Diario Pueblo, 1977)

Far-right political party alliances in Spain
Falangist parties
Defunct political party alliances in Spain
Defunct nationalist parties in Spain
Fascist parties in Spain
Falangism
Francoist Spain
Political history of Spain
Spanish nationalism
Catholic political parties